The Golden Child is the debut studio album by American rapper YK Osiris. It was released on October 11, 2019 through Def Jam Recordings. It features guest appearances from Jah Vinci, Kehlani, Russ, Tory Lanez and Ty Dolla $ign. 

The album debuted at number 90 on the US Billboard 200 chart. The lead single, Kiwi-produced song "Valentine" was certified Gold by the Recording Industry Association of America on April 25, 2019. The second single, "Worth It", was certified Platinum by the RIAA on October 30, 2019, and became Osiris' first song to hit the Billboard Hot 100 chart.

Track listing

Charts

Certifications

See also
2019 in hip hop music

References

2019 debut albums
Def Jam Recordings albums
Albums produced by Needlz
Albums produced by London on da Track
Albums produced by Mars (record producer)